San Jose or San José Formation may refer to:
 San Jose Formation, Eocene geologic formation of Colorado and New Mexico
 San José Formation, Argentina, Miocene geologic formation of Argentina
 San José Formation, Peru, Ordovician geologic formation of Peru
 San José Formation, Uruguay, Mio-Pliocene geologic formation of Uruguay